The 2010 Alessandria Challenger (known as 2010 Trofeo Cassa di Risparmio Alessandria due to sponsorship) was a professional tennis tournament played on outdoor red clay courts. It was part of the 2010 ATP Challenger Tour. It took place in Alessandria, Italy between May 24–30, 2010.

ATP entrants

Seeds

Rankings are as of May 17, 2010.

Other entrants
The following players received wildcards into the singles main draw:
  Laurynas Grigelis
  Jacopo Marchegiani
  Marco Crugnola
  Matteo Trevisan

The following players received special exempt into the singles main draw:
  Alexander Peya

The following players received entry into the singles main draw with a protected ranking:
  Simone Vagnozzi

The following players received entry from the qualifying draw:
  Matteo Viola
  Iñigo Cervantes-Huegun
  Alex Bogomolov Jr.
  Daniel Muñoz de la Nava

Champions

Men's singles

 Björn Phau def.  Carlos Berlocq, 7–6(6), 2–6, 6–2

Men's doubles

 Ivan Dodig /  Lovro Zovko def.  Marco Crugnola /  Daniel Muñoz de la Nava, 6–4, 6–4

References
ITF search 

Alessandria Challenger
Alessandria Challenger